Margarita Matjuhhova (née Žernosekova; born 29 January 1988) is an Estonian football striker currently playing for Pärnu JK in the Meistriliiga. She has also played for Levadia Tallinn, taking part in the Champions League with both teams. In 2008, she was named Estonian Young Footballer of the Year.

She is a member of the Estonian national team. She has also played for Levadia Tallinn, taking part in the Champions League with both teams.

References

External links

1988 births
Living people
Estonian women's footballers
Estonia women's international footballers
Estonian people of Russian descent
Women's association football forwards
Pärnu JK players
FC Levadia Tallinn (women) players